The 2014 Metro Atlantic Athletic Conference baseball tournament was held from May 21 through 25.  The top six regular season finishers of the league's eleven teams met in the double-elimination tournament held at FirstEnergy Park in Lakewood, New Jersey.  Siena won the tournament for the fifth time, earning the conference's automatic bid to the 2014 NCAA Division I baseball tournament.

Seeding
The top six teams were seeded one through four based on their conference winning percentage.  They then played a double-elimination tournament.

Results

Line Scores

Wednesday, May 21st
Game 1           12:00pm            #3 Fairfield vs. #6 Manhattan

Game 2           3:30pm              #4 Quinnipiac vs. #5 Monmouth

Game 3           7:00pm              #1 Canisius vs. #4 Quinnipiac

Thursday, May 22nd
Game 4           12:00pm            #2 Siena vs. #3 Fairfield

Game 6 was postponed due to weather, Game 5 was suspended in the 9th inning and completed on Friday.

Friday, May 23rd
Game 5           10:30am            #5 Monmouth vs. #6 Manhattan (Completion of game suspended in 9th inning)

Manhattan was eliminated

Game 6           1:00pm              #4 Quinnipiac vs. #5 Monmouth

Quinnipiac was eliminated

Game 7            5:00pm            #1 Canisius vs. #3 Fairfield

Game 8 was postponed due to weather and rescheduled to Saturday

Saturday, May 24th

Monmouth was eliminated

Game 9            3:30pm            #2 Siena vs. #3 Fairfield

Fairfield was eliminated

Sunday, May 25th
Game 10          12:00pm          #1 Canisius vs. #2 Siena

Game 11           3:40pm           #1 Canisius vs. #2 Siena

Canisius was eliminated

All-Tournament Team
The following players were named to the All-Tournament Team. Siena infielder Vincent Citro, one of four Saints selected, was named the Most Outstanding Player.

References

Tournament
Metro Atlantic Athletic Conference Baseball Tournament
Metro Atlantic Athletic Conference baseball tournament
Baseball in New Jersey
College sports in New Jersey